A cosmic ocean, world ocean, or celestial river is a mythological tradition found in many cultures and civilizations, representing the world or cosmos enveloped by "primordial waters." The waters existed before creation, and from these primordial waters the earth and the entire cosmos arose, one of the main embodiments of chaos or chaos itself. The waters act as an element and the space filled by the element, in various personified forms (in the guise of divine characters and monsters associated with chaos), as well as an abstract speculative principle.

The primacy of the ocean in some creation myths corresponds to the cosmological model of land surrounded by the world ocean. The sky is often thought of as something like the upper sea. The concept of a watery chaos also underlies the widespread motif of the worldwide flood that took place in early times. The emergence of earth from water, the curbing of the global flood or underground waters are usually presented as a factor in cosmic ordering.

Background
In ancient creation texts, the primordial waters are often represented as originally having filled the entire universe and being the first source of the gods cosmos with the act of creation corresponding to the establishment of an inhabitable space separate from the enveloping waters.

The ocean is boundless, unordered, unorganized, amorphous, formless, dangerous, terrible. In some myths, its cacophony is noted , opposed to the ordered rhythm of the sea.

[[Chaos (cosmogony)|Chaos]] can be concretized as water or the unorganized interaction of water and fire, and the transformation of chaos into space as a transition from water to land. In many ancient cosmogonic myths, the ocean and chaos are equivalent and inseparable from each other. According to this concept, the ocean remains outside space even after the emergence of the latter. At the same time, the ability of the ocean to generate is realized in the appearance of the earth from it and in the presence in the depths of the ocean of a mythological creature that promotes generation or, on the contrary, zealously defends the "old order" and prevents the beginning of the chain of births from the ocean.

Common themes

Yu. E. Berezkin and E. N. Duvakin generalize the motif of primary waters as follows: "Waters are primary. The earth is launched into the water, appears above the water, grows from a piece of solid substance placed on the surface of the water or liquid mud, from an island in the ocean, is exposed when the waters subsided, etc.".

The idea of the primacy of the ocean as an element, from the bowels of which the earth arises or is created, has a universal character. This representation is present in almost all mythologies of the world, starting with the aboriginal Australian one. Much less often there is a motive for the emergence of the world as a result of the interaction of two elements of water or ice with fire. Typical examples are Scandinavian and Iranian mythologies.

Eggs are a common them in creation myths, with the motif of a diver, a waterfowl extracting silt from the sea, from which land is gradually created. In totemic myths, bird people are often presented as  phratrial ancestors, which could contribute to the development of such a myth.

A diving bird, catching a lump of earth from the primordial ocean, often appears in the  mythologies of the Native Americans and Siberian peoples. In Polynesian mythology, Maui fishes islands. In Scandinavian mythology, the gods raise the earth, and only Thor catches the "serpent of middle earth" from the bottom of the ocean. In ancient Egyptian mythology, the earth itself comes to the surface in the form of a mound. This specific motif corresponds to the picture of the flooding of the Nile. The primary hill is identified with the sun god named Ra - Atum. In the Brahmana was said that Prajapati took the earth out of the water, taking the form of a boar.

In many mythologies of Asian countries, in which there is an image of an endless and eternal primordial ocean or sea, there is a motif of the creation of the earth by a celestial being descending from the sky and interfering with the water of the ocean with an iron club, spear or other object, as a result of which condensation occurs, giving rise to the earth. A similar creation myth is present in the Mongolian tradition. In Japanese mythology, the islands of Japan arose from dirty foam raised by mixing the waters of the ocean with a spear of a divine character (Izanagi and Izanami). In the mythologies of the Mongolian peoples, the role of the compactor of the ocean waters is played by the wind, which creates a special milky substance out of them, which becomes the earth's firmament. According to the Kalmyks, plants, animals, people and gods were born from this milky liquid of the original ocean. These versions reveal a connection with the Indian myth of the churning of the Ocean of Milk.

This myth contains the motif of the confrontation between the elements of water and fire. As a result of the rapid rotation, a whorl lights up - Mount Mandara, but trees and grasses emit their juices into the drying ocean. This motif echoes the Tungus myths about the creation of the earth by a celestial being, which, with the help of fire, dries up part of the primordial ocean, thus reclaiming a place for the earth. The motif of the struggle of water and fire in connection with the theme of the world ocean is also present in other traditions.

Myths about the world's oceans are universally accompanied by myths about its containment when the earth was already created, and myths about the attempts of the ocean to regain its undivided dominance. In Chinese mythology, there is the idea of a giant depression or pit that determines the direction of the ocean waters and takes away excess water. In the mythology of the peoples of the world there are numerous legends about the flood.

The opposition of two types of myths is known (for example, in Oceania) - about the earth sinking in the ocean, and about the retreat of the ocean or sea. An example of the first type is the legend about the origin of Easter Island, recorded on this island. In the creation myth of the Nganasan people, at first the earth was completely covered with water, then the water subsides and exposes the top of the Shaitan ridge Koika-mou. The first two people fall to this peak - a man and a woman. In the myth of creation of the Tuamotu Islands, the creator Tāne, "Spilling Water", created the world in the waters of the lord of the waters, Pune, and invoked the light that initiated the creation of the earth.

The motif of the cosmogonic struggle with the serpent (dragon) is widespread in terms of suppressing water chaos. The serpent in most mythologies is associated with water, often as its abductor. He threatens either with a flood or a drought, that is, a violation of the measure, the water "balance". Since the cosmos is identified with order and measure, chaos is associated with the violation of measure. The Egyptian Ra-Atum fights the underground serpent Apep, the Indian Indra - with Vritra, who took the form of a snake, the Mesopotamian Enki, Ninurta or Inanna - with the owner of the underworld Kur, the Iranian Tishtry (Sirius) - with the deva Aposhi. Apop, Vritra, Kur and Aposhi hold back the cosmic waters. Enlil or Marduk defeats the progenitor Tiamat, the wife of Apsu, the personification of the dark waters of chaos, who has taken the form of a dragon. There are hints in the Bible about the struggle of God with a dragon or a wonderful fish, which also represents water chaos (Rahab, Tehom, Leviathan). Yu the Great's heroic struggle with the cosmic flood ends with the murder of the insidious owner of the water Gungun and his "close associate" - the nine-headed Xiangliu.

The transition from the formless water element to land is the most important act necessary for the transformation of chaos into space. The next step in the same direction is the separation of the sky from the earth, which, perhaps, essentially coincides with the first act, given the initial identification of the sky with the oceans. But it was precisely the repetition of the act - first down, and then up - that led to the allocation of three spheres - earthly, heavenly and underground, which represents the transition from binary division to trinity. The middle sphere, the earth, opposes the watery world below and the heavenly world above. A trichotomous scheme of the cosmos arises, including the necessary space between earth and sky. This space is often represented as a cosmic tree. Earth and sky are almost universally represented as feminine and masculine, a married couple standing at the beginning of a theogonic or theocosmogonic process. At the same time, the feminine principle is sometimes associated with the element of water and with chaos; usually it is conceived on the side of "nature" rather than "culture."

Mythical creatures personifying chaos, defeated, shackled, overthrown, often continue to exist on the outskirts of space, along the shores of the oceans, in the underground "lower" world, in some special parts of the sky. So, in Scandinavian mythology, frost giants precede time, and in space they are located on the outskirts of the earth's circle, in cold places, near the oceans.

In world cultures

Christianity
In the first creation story in the Bible the world is created as a space inside of the water or Tehom, and is hence surrounded of it, "And God saith, 'Let there be a firmament in the midst of the waters, and let it divide the waters from the waters.'".

Egyptian mythology

In ancient Egyptian mythology, the concept of chaos is etymologically associated with darkness (kek), but primarily about water chaos in the form of the primary ocean (Nun) or, in the Germanic version, five divine pairs representing its different aspects. Water chaos is opposed by the first earthly mound protruding from it, with which Atum is associated in Heliopolis (as Ra-Atum), and in Memphis  Ptah. Initially, the existing ocean is personified in the image of the "father of the gods" Nun. From the primordial ocean, Nuna creates himself, the primordial, primordial, miraculous lord Atum, which then creates heaven, earth, snakes, etc. from Nun. In the historical era, the ocean, which was placed underground, gave rise to the river Nile. In the Heracleopolis version of the myth, an internal connection between the ocean and chaos is noted.

Indian mythology

In Indian mythology, there is an idea of darkness and the abyss (Asat), but also of the primary waters generated by night or chaos. Ancient Indian myths about the oceans contain both typical and original motifs. In the tenth mandala of the Rigveda, the original state of the universe is presented as the absence of existing and non-existent, airspace and sky above it, death and immortality, day and night, but the presence of water and disorderly movement. In the waters of the eternal ocean, there was a life-giving principle generated by the power of heat and giving birth to everything else. Another mandala of the Rigveda contains a different version: "Law and truths were born from the kindled heat...", hence the surging ocean. Out of the tumultuous ocean a year was born, distributing days and nights. "Rigveda" repeatedly mentions the generative power of the ocean ("multiple," it roars at its first spread, giving rise to creations, the bearer of wealth), its thousands of streams flowing from the depths, it is said that the ocean is the spouse of rivers. The cosmic ocean forms the frame of the cosmos, separating it from chaos. The ocean is personified by the god Varuna . Varuna is associated both with the destructive and uncontrolled power of the waters of the oceans, and with fruitful waters that bring wealth to people.

Indian mythology is characterized by the image of the creator god (Brahma or Vishnu), floating on the primary waters in a lotus flower, on the dragon Shesha.

Persian mythology
Fraxkard (Avestan: Vourukaša; also called Warkaš in Middle Persian) is the cosmic ocean in Iranian mythology.

Sumerian mythology

In Sumerian mythology , there was an image of the original sea abyss - Abzu, on the site of which the most active of the gods Enki, representing the earth, fresh water and agriculture on irrigated lands, made his home. In the beginning, the entire space of the world was filled with an ocean that had neither beginning nor end. It was probably believed that he was eternal. In its bowels lurked the foremother Nammu. In her womb arose a cosmic mountain in the form of a hemisphere, which later became the earth. An arc of shiny tin, encircling the hemisphere vertically, later became the sky. In the Babylonian version, in the endless primordial Ocean there was nothing but two monsters - the forefather Apsuand foremother Tiamat.

Zoroastrianism
Vourukasha is the name of a heavenly sea in Zoroastrian mythology. It was created by Ahura Mazda and in its middle stood the Harvisptokhm or the "tree of all seeds".

According to the Vendidad, Ahura Mazda sent the clean waters of Vourukasha down to the earth in order to cleanse the world and sent the water back to the heavenly sea Puitika. This phenomenon was later interpreted as the coming and going of the tide. At the centre of Vourukasha was located the Harvisptokhm or "tree of all seeds", which contains the seeds of all plants in the world. There is a bird Sinamru on the tree which causes the bough to break and seeds to sprinkle all around when it alights.

At the center of the Vourukasha also grows the Gaokerena or "White Haoma", considered to be the "king of healing plants".  It is surrounded by ten thousand other healing plants.

In later times, Vourukasha was connected with the Persian Sea and the Puitika with the Gulf of Oman.

See also

 Abzu
 Ap (water)
 Arche
 Danava (Hinduism)
 Danu (Asura)
 Erlik
 Firmament
 Heh (god)
 Heryshaf
 Nu (mythology)
 Oceanus
 Rasā
 Samudra
 Sea (astronomy)
 Sea of Suf
 Styx
 Tehom
 Unhcegila

References

Bibliography

 

 

Creation myths
Water and religion
Chaos (cosmogony)
Biblical cosmology